Claude Cooper may refer to:

 Claude Cooper (actor) (1880–1932), English-American character actor
 Claude Cooper (baseball) (1892–1974), outfielder in Major League Baseball